Xestia efflorescens is a moth of the family Noctuidae. It is known from eastern Asia, the Amur Region, Korea and Japan.

The wingspan is 40–45 mm.

References

Xestia
Moths of Asia